Durwin Talon (born in London, Ontario) is a comics artist, illustrator, author and professor of illustration.

Early life and education
Talon developed an interest in art at an early age.  He received his bachelor's degree in Fine Arts (BFA) from the Savannah College of Art and Design (SCAD), then received his ISDP Master's Degree (MA) from Syracuse University in the United States. In 2007, he received the terminal degree of Masters of Fine Arts (MFA) in Illustration from the University of Hartford.

Career
Durwin worked as a professor at the Savannah College of Art and Design. He taught in the Sequential Art, Illustration, Graphic Design and Computer Art departments.

After almost a decade at SCAD, Durwin moved to Indiana to teach at Indiana University-Purdue University Indianapolis.

In August 2007, Talon left IUPUI to resume teaching at the Savannah College of Art and Design. In 2010, he took a position as Associate Professor of Illustration at Emily Carr University of Art and Design. In 2015, he took the position of Head Professor of Illustration at Grand Valley State University.

Talon's first book, Panel Discussions from TwoMorrows Publishing, is an overview of techniques for developing sequential art by some of the most notable names in the comics field. It has been described as "indispensable reading for anyone interested in the subject of sequential art."

His second book, Comics Above Ground, also from TwoMorrows Publishing, features top comics professionals talking about their inspirations and training from the comics profession and its effects in "Mainstream Media," including: Conceptual Illustration, Video Game Development, Children's Books, Novels, Design, Illustration, Video Game Animation, Motion Pictures and other media.

His artwork has been featured on the covers of Batman ("Officer Down"), Skinwalker, and Queen & Country. A review of Skinwalker No. 3 commented that "[t]he covers by Durwin Talon are a wonderful blend of pastel and oil that prompt you into wishing we could read a whole book that looks like this."

He has contributed artwork for Marvel Comics and DC Comics as well as worked on games and trading cards for Upper Deck, White Wolf, Inc. and Wizards of the Coast.  His sequential artwork has been accepted into the Society of Illustrators' 49th Annual Exhibition.

He worked on his own comic Bonds, and Beautiful Scars, in collaboration with Guin Thompson. The first two issues of Bonds were released by Image Comics in 2007 and issue No. 3 shipped and completed the series in 2009. Beautiful Scars is an original graphic novel being published by Archaia Studios Press, and will be released in March 2014.

Until August 2007, Talon was an Associate Professor, in the New Media Program at the School of Informatics at Indiana University-Purdue University Indianapolis, before returning to the Illustration department at Savannah College of Art and Design. Currently, he is The Head Professor of Illustration at Grand Valley State University in Allendale, Mi, USA.

Bibliography

Books
Panel Discussions: Design in Sequential Art Storytelling (TwoMorrows Publishing, 2002, reprinted July 2007)
Comics Above Ground: How Sequential Art Affects Mainstream Media (TwoMorrows Publishing, 2004)

Comics

Interior work
Bonds (Image Comics, August 2007)
Beautiful Scars (with Guin Thompson, Original graphic novel, Archaia Studios Press, March 2014, forthcoming)

Cover work
Batman: Officer Down (DC Comics)
Queen & Country (Oni Press)
Skinwalker (Oni Press)

Games
Upper Deck
White Wolf, Inc.
Wizards of the Coast

References

Inline citations

General references

 RPG Database profile
 New Media professor receives recognition from prestigious illustrators organization, February 12, 2007

External links
 Profile site

Interviews
 CBR News: Durwin Talon "Bonds" with Comics, Comic Book Resources, July 11, 2007
 Interview, Slushfactory, July 16, 2007
 Announcing: Stories Take on New Meaning in Archaia’s “Beautiful Scars” Exclusive, Multiversity Comics, December 9, 2013

Artists from London, Ontario
Canadian illustrators
Canadian comics artists
Canadian academics
Savannah College of Art and Design faculty
Living people
Syracuse University alumni
University of Hartford alumni
Year of birth missing (living people)
Indiana University–Purdue University Indianapolis faculty